Dorchester is a station on the Port Authority of Allegheny County's light rail network, located in Bethel Park, Pennsylvania. The street level stop was added to the route to serve the nearby Dorchester Apartment complex, for which the stop was named. A variety of apartment blocks have been located near the stop, as part of a transit village model designed to encourage public transit as the primary form of transportation for residents.

References

External links 

Port Authority T Stations Listings
Station from Google Maps Street View

Port Authority of Allegheny County stations
Railway stations in the United States opened in 1984
Blue Line (Pittsburgh)
Red Line (Pittsburgh)